Paracupta is a genus of beetles in the family Buprestidae, containing the following species:

 Paracupta aeneicollis Saunders, 1869
 Paracupta aeneiventris Saunders, 1874
 Paracupta albilatera Fairmaire, 1879
 Paracupta aruensis (Kerremans, 1891)
 Paracupta auricollis Kerremans, 1898
 Paracupta basicornis Fairmaire, 1877
 Paracupta chrysodemoides Obenberger, 1928
 Paracupta coelestis Kerremans, 1892
 Paracupta convexa (Montrouzier, 1860)
 Paracupta cupricostata Kerremans, 1919
 Paracupta dilutipes Fairmaire, 1878
 Paracupta evansi Théry, 1937
 Paracupta girardii Deyrolle, 1864
 Paracupta glauca Kerremans, 1919
 Paracupta hauseri Obenberger, 1928
 Paracupta hebridana Obenberger, 1916
 Paracupta helopioides (Boisduval, 1835)
 Paracupta hoscheki Obenberger, 1916
 Paracupta imperatrix Obenberger, 1928
 Paracupta impressipennis (Théry, 1943)
 Paracupta isabellina Kerremans, 1900
 Paracupta laevissima Kerremans, 1909
 Paracupta lamberti (Laporte & Gory, 1835)
 Paracupta lateimpressa Fairmaire, 1878
 Paracupta leveri Théry, 1934
 Paracupta lorquinii Saunders, 1869
 Paracupta maindroni Kerremans, 1909
 Paracupta manni Théry, 1937
 Paracupta marginalis Kerremans, 1903
 Paracupta meyeri Kerremans, 1900
 Paracupta ocellata (Lander & Neef de Sainval, 2000)
 Paracupta pisciformis Kerremans, 1900
 Paracupta prasina (Gräffe, 1868)
 Paracupta pyroglypta Fairmaire, 1877
 Paracupta pyrura Fairmaire, 1877
 Paracupta samoensis Saunders, 1874
 Paracupta sulcata Saunders, 1869
 Paracupta suturalis Saunders, 1869
 Paracupta tibialis Saunders, 1872
 Paracupta toxopeusi Obenberger, 1932
 Paracupta xanthocera (Boiduval, 1835)

References

Buprestidae genera